Salomone is a surname. Notable people with the surname include:

Alphonse W. Salomone Jr. (1919–1993), Canadian-American hotelier
Bruno Salomone (born 1970), French actor and comedian
Marco Antonio Salomone (died 1615), Roman Catholic prelate
Rocco Salomone (1965–2015), American football coach